The Supreme Court of Maryland is the highest court of the U.S. state of Maryland. Its name was changed on December 14, 2022 from the Maryland Court of Appeals to its current name by a constitutional amendment. The court, which is composed of one chief justice and six associate justices, meets in the Robert C. Murphy Courts of Appeal Building in the state capital, Annapolis. The term of the Court begins the second Monday of September. The Court is unique among American courts in that the justices wear red robes.

Functions
As Maryland's highest court, the Supreme Court of Maryland reviews cases of both major and minor importance. Throughout the year, the Supreme Court of Maryland holds hearings on the adoption or amendment of rules of practice and procedure. It also supervises the Attorney Grievance Commission and State Board of Law Examiners in attorney disciplinary and admission matters. The Chief Justice of the Supreme Court of Maryland, designated by the Governor, is the constitutional administrative head of the Maryland judicial system.

Cases typically come before the Supreme Court of Maryland on a petition for a writ of certiorari to the Appellate Court of Maryland.  The court can decline the petition, and refuse to hear the case, or it can grant the "cert," and hear the appeal.  The justices sometimes decide to hear an appeal before the lower appellate court has heard the case. This is known as the Court 'granting certiorari on its own motion', or 'reaching down'. In this instance, the writ of certiorari is issued to the trial court, rather than to the Appellate Court of Maryland (Maryland's intermediate appellate court, or appellate court of right).

The court does not sit in panels; all seven justices sit on each case (en banc) unless there is a disqualification, in which event a judge from another court, or a retired appellate judge, may be specially assigned to sit in the place of the disqualified justice. In practice, almost all cases are heard by seven justices, though a quorum for the court is five justices.

While it is generally an Appellate court and hears most cases on appeal, the Supreme Court of Maryland has exclusive jurisdiction over certain matters, such as legislative redistricting, removal of certain officers, and certification of questions of law.  Additionally, it had exclusive jurisdiction in death penalty appeals prior to the abolition of capital punishment in Maryland.

The Supreme Court of Maryland likewise retains original jurisdiction to discipline all attorneys admitted to the practice of law in Maryland. It can impose penalties ranging from reprimands to the ultimate punishment, disbarment.

Justices

Appointment and qualifications
The seven justices of the Supreme Court of Maryland are appointed by the Governor of Maryland with Senate consent. They serve ten-year terms. However, note that the ballot for re-election says only 'for continuance in office'. I.e. there is no opposing candidate.

The justices of the court are required to be citizens of and qualified voters in Maryland.  Prior to their appointment, they must have lived in Maryland for at least five years, and must have lived for at least six months in the appellate judicial circuit from which they are appointed. They must be at least thirty years of age at the time of appointment, and must have been admitted to practice law in Maryland. Appointees should be "most distinguished for integrity, wisdom and sound legal knowledge."

After initial appointment by the Governor and confirmation by the Senate, members of the court, at the first general election occurring at least one year after their appointment, run for continuance in office on their records without opposition. If the voters reject the retention in office of a justice, or the vote is tied, the office becomes vacant. Otherwise, the incumbent justice is retained in office for a ten-year term. This requirement of voter approval is similar to provisions in the Missouri Plan, a non-partisan method for selecting judges which is used by 11 states. Like all Maryland judges, members of the Supreme Court of Maryland must retire by their 70th birthday.

There is one justice from each of the state's seven Judicial Circuits. Each justice is required to be a resident of his or her respective circuit.  The circuits are currently as follows:

Current justices

Unlike most other American federal, state, and local courts, the justices on the Supreme Court of Maryland wear red robes and with white cross-collars, reminiscent of British court dress. Judges at all other levels of the Maryland judiciary wear the more customary black robes.

Senior justices
Justices of the Supreme Court of Maryland who no longer wish to work full time, or wish to have more control over their schedules, may become senior justices and be appointed to hear cases if: they were not removed or involuntarily retired from the bench, they did not leave the bench for reason of disability, they did not leave the bench because they lost an election or did not gain Senate confirmation, they were not censured by the Supreme Court of Maryland upon recommendation of the Commission on Judicial Disabilities, and they do not engage in the practice of law.

History

As the highest tribunal in Maryland, the Court of Appeals was created by Article 56 of the Maryland Constitution of 1776. The Court was to be "composed of persons of integrity and sound judgment in the law, whose judgment shall be final and conclusive in all cases of appeal, from the general court, court of chancery, and court of admiralty . . ." With counsel, advice and consent, the Governor appointed all of the judges. Five judges were commissioned in 1778, but that number was reduced to three in 1801. The Court was restructured in 1806 by dividing the State into six judicial districts with a chief judge and two associate judges for each district appointed by the Governor and Council. Together, these six chief judges constituted the Court of Appeals which began to sit on the Eastern Shore at Easton as well as on the Western Shore at the State capital.

The Maryland Constitution of 1851 divided the State into four judicial districts. Voters of each district elected a judge to the Court of Appeals for a ten-year term. The Court became responsible solely for appellate duties and sat only at Annapolis, whereas before it sat in various locations throughout the State. Five judges, each elected from one of five judicial districts, were prescribed by the Maryland Constitution of 1864.

The Maryland Constitution of 1867 (currently in effect) returned to the older form of requiring Court of Appeals judges to assume trial court and appellate duties. In seven judicial circuits, the Governor, with Senate advice and consent, designated a chief judge. In the eighth judicial circuit (Baltimore City), the voters elected the chief judge. These eight chief judges then constituted the Court of Appeals.

Judicial reorganization in 1943 provided for a five-member Court of Appeals elected for terms of fifteen years. The five judges included two from Baltimore City and one each from three appellate judicial circuits. In 1960, the number of judges was increased to the present-day seven. Until 1994, there was one from each of the first five Appellate Judicial Circuits and two from the Sixth Appellate Judicial Circuit (Baltimore City), but a Constitutional amendment realigned the circuits to create seven circuits with one judge from each.  Since 1975, the Court of Appeals has heard cases almost exclusively by way of certiorari. As a result, the Court's formerly excessive workload has been reduced to a more manageable level, thus allowing the Court to devote more time to the most important and far-reaching issues.

Prior to 2022, the Court joined the New York Court of Appeals in being the only two state highest courts to bear the name "Court of Appeals" rather than "Supreme Court", though the Texas Court of Criminal Appeals is that state's highest criminal court that bears the name "Court of Appeals".

In the 2022 general election held on November 8, 2022, voters approved a constitutional amendment to change the name of the court to the "Supreme Court of Maryland", and the title of its judges to "Justice." It became effective on December 14, 2022.

See also
 Courts of Maryland
 Government of Maryland
 Appellate Court of Maryland

References

External links 
 Homepage for the Supreme Court of Maryland
 Information from the Maryland Archives
 Maryland Constitution, Article IV: Judiciary Department
 Red Robes and the Maryland Court of Appeals
 Judicial Records from The Archives of Maryland

 Court Overview | Maryland Courts

State supreme courts of the United States
Maryland state courts
1776 establishments in Maryland
Courts and tribunals established in 1776